Luigi Ferrara (born 12 May 1982) is an Italian racing driver from Bari.

Career

He began his career in feeder formula series such as the Formula Renault 2.0 Italia, Eurocup Formula Renault 2.0, Italian Formula Three and International Formula Master. He was champion in 2005 of the Italian Formula Three Championship with team Corbetta Competizioni.

Ferrara switched to sports car in 2008, and won the Porsche Carrera Cup Italy. In 2009 he raced part-time at the Porsche Supercup.

In 2010, the driver joined the Superstars Series with the CAAL team. Driving a Mercedes-Benz C 63 AMG, he collected four wins and 10 podiums in 20 races, resulting second in the International Series and third in the Italian Championship.

At the 2011 Superstars Series, Ferrara got one win and eight podiums in 18 races. He ended again runner-up in the International Series and third in the Italian Championship.

The Italian only competed in two rounds of the 2012 season: Spa-Francorchamps with CAAL and Pergusa with Roma, in both cases with a Mercedes-Benz. He finished second and fourth out of four races, and resulted 16th in the International Series.

Ferrara returned full-time to the Superstars Series for the 2013, remaining in the Roma team. He is currently fifth in the standings with one win and seven podiums out of 13 starts.

Racing record

Complete TCR International Series results
(key) (Races in bold indicate pole position) (Races in italics indicate fastest lap)

Complete World Touring Car Cup results
(key) (Races in bold indicate pole position) (Races in italics indicate fastest lap)

† Driver did not finish the race, but was classified as he completed over 90% of the race distance.

NASCAR

Whelen Euro Series – EuroNASCAR PRO
(key) (Bold – Pole position. Italics – Fastest lap. * – Most laps led. ^ – Most positions gained)

References

External links

1982 births
Living people
Italian racing drivers
Italian Formula Renault 2.0 drivers
Formula Renault Eurocup drivers
Italian Formula Three Championship drivers
International Formula Master drivers
Sportspeople from Bari
Porsche Supercup drivers
Superstars Series drivers
TCR Europe Touring Car Series drivers
NASCAR drivers